

Firebird Raceway is a motorsport racing venue in the western United States, near Eagle, Idaho, in the Boise metropolitan area. The raceway opened  in 1968 under management of racing enthusiasts Bill and Ellanor New, and it has remained under ownership of the New family.

A longstanding member track of the National Hot Rod Association (NHRA), the raceway has been named NHRA Track of the Year three times. It was added to the National Register of Historic Places in 2018, the first dragstrip to be included on the register.

History
Firebird Raceway was incorporated on May 11, 1968, by Ronald Ashley, J.S. Chapman, and J.W. Korn. Bob Riggle and his Hurst Hemi Under Glass were featured on opening day, July 28, 1968.

In 1969, the raceway hosted one of six Northwest Regional World Championship drag meets. Later that year the raceway hosted the first annual Nitromethane Invitational Championship, a Top Fuel event.

The annual NAPA Auto Parts Ignitor competition began in 1971, and the Pepsi Nightfire Nationals began in 1972.

Director Don Almeido's documentary, Firebird Raceway 35th Annual Pepsi Nightfire Nationals, was released in 2007.

References

External links
 
 Firebird Raceway official website

Further reading
 Firebird Raceway (Eagle), Drag Strip List
 Firebird Raceway listed in National Register of Historic Places, National Hot Rod Association
 Idaho's Firebird Raceway becomes first dragstrip listed on the National Register of Historic Places, Hemmings Daily

National Register of Historic Places in Ada County, Idaho
Sports venues completed in 1968
NHRA Division 6 drag racing venues
Motorsport venues in Idaho
Buildings and structures in Ada County, Idaho
Off-road racing venues in the United States